View model may refer to:

 Conceptual view model in data modelling for example:
 ANSI-SPARC Architecture
 Model–View–Controller, an architectural pattern used in software engineering.
 Model–view–adapter, another architectural pattern used in software engineering
 View model in enterprise architecture for example:
 4+1 Architectural View Model

See also 

 Modeling perspective
 Point of view (disambiguation)
 Three schema approach
 View (disambiguation)
 Viewpoint (disambiguation)